Justo Albornoz (29 January 1926 – 22 June 1981) was a Chilean footballer.  He competed in the men's tournament at the 1952 Summer Olympics.

References

External links
 
 

1926 births
1981 deaths
Chilean footballers
Chile international footballers
Olympic footballers of Chile
Footballers at the 1952 Summer Olympics
Place of birth missing
Association football forwards
Naval de Talcahuano footballers